Phyllis Allen (November 25, 1861 – March 26, 1938) was an American vaudeville and silent screen comedian. She worked with Charles Chaplin, Mabel Normand, Roscoe "Fatty" Arbuckle, and Mack Sennett during a film career spanning 74 movies in the decade between 1913 and 1923. Due to her imposing demeanour and perennially haughty expression, she was quite similar in appearance to fellow screen comedian Marie Dressler.

Partial filmography

Forced Bravery (1913)
Murphy's I.O.U. (1913)
Peeping Pete (1913)
The Riot (1913)
Mother's Boy (1913)
Two Old Tars (1913)
Fatty at San Diego (1913)
Rebecca's Wedding Day (1914)
A Robust Romeo (1914)
A Busy Day (1914)
Love and Bullets (1914)
Caught in a Cabaret (1914)
The Rounders (1914)
Hello, Mabel (1914)
Lover's Luck (1914)
Gentlemen of Nerve (1914)
His Trysting Place (1914)
Getting Acquainted (1914)
Leading Lizzie Astray (1914)
Tillie's Punctured Romance (1914) (uncredited)
That Little Band of Gold (1915)
Fatty's Plucky Pup (1915)
Fickle Fatty's Fall (1915)
A Submarine Pirate (1915)
A Night in the Show (1915)
The Adventurer (1917)
The Vagabond (1916)
White Youth (1920)
Pay Day (1922) with Charles Chaplin
The Pilgrim (1923)

References

External links

People from Staten Island
American women comedians
American silent film actresses
Actresses from New York City
1861 births
1938 deaths
20th-century American actresses
American film actresses
Vaudeville performers
Actresses from Los Angeles
Comedians from California
Comedians from New York City
20th-century American comedians